Bradley Aaron Knowles (born 29 October 1981) is an Australian cricketer who previously played domestically for Victoria and Western Australia. A right-arm fast bowler, Knowles made his Pura Cup debut for Victoria against New South Wales in 2004–05, as a replacement for Mick Lewis. Knowles lost his Cricket Victoria contract at the end of an "injury interrupted" 2006/07 season, although he played a match for Victoria after that. Knowles moved to Western Australia for the 2008/09 season and, after showing form in the local competition, was given two opportunities with the Western Warriors at the end of the season. In the latter of the two matches, Knowles had career best bowling figures of 5/42. He was subsequently signed by the Warriors for the 2009/10 season. Following an "impressive" first season for the Warriors, in which he was the team's second leading wicket taker, Knowles injured his knee before the start of the 2010/11 season, causing him to miss the entire season.

References

External links

1981 births
Living people
Australian cricketers
Victoria cricketers
Western Australia cricketers
Cricketers from Victoria (Australia)
People from Moe, Victoria